Sally Flynn (born July 23, 1946 in Ontario, Oregon) is an American singer and musician (also known as Sally Hart) who was a featured performer on The Lawrence Welk Show television program.

A graduate of Brigham Young University (BYU), she and BYU classmate Sandi Griffiths joined The Lawrence Welk Show in 1968 as the singing act of Sandi & Salli. The duo was very popular on the show until late 1972 when Sally left to pursue a solo career on Broadway.

On December 6, 1974, Flynn married Clay Hart, a country singer who was on the Welk show from 1969 to 1975, and shortly afterward they started singing together professionally; often as opening acts for performers such as Red Skelton, Juliet Prowse and Mel Tillis. She was noted for her warmth and fiddle playing. The Harts have also released several albums, owned a tote bag business—Get Sack—and have hosted their own show on The Nashville Network called Remodeling & Decorating Today.
 
They also appeared in wrap-around segments for reruns of the Welk Show on PBS and have toured the United States with their fellow Welk stars in the Forever Blowing Bubbles concert series. Today, the Harts make their home in Melbourne, Florida, where she sings frequently with the Melbourne Swingtime Band and other local groups. Flynn is a Latter-day Saint.

References 

1946 births
Brigham Young University alumni
Latter Day Saints from Oregon
Latter Day Saints from Florida
Living people
American women singers
People from Ontario, Oregon
Lawrence Welk